"Dirty Love" is a song by the British drum and bass producer Wilkinson. It features vocals from British singer Talay Riley. It was released on 12 October 2014 through RAM Records as the first single from the extended edition of his debut studio album Lazers Not Included, and the seventh single overall. The song entered the UK Singles Chart at number 20, after sitting at number 13 in the midweeks.

Background and release
Originally set to be the seventh single from Lazers Not Included 2.0, "Dirty Love" was set to feature on the deluxe re-release of Wilkinson's debut album Lazers Not Included. The song was to be released on 21 September 2014, followed by the album on 18 August 2014, which was to feature six previously unheard tracks. However, the project was scrapped and the songs from it will feature on his second studio album that will be released in 2015. An "extended edition" of his debut album was released, however, and includes this song alongside remixes of and by Wilkinson.

Music video
A music video to accompany the release of "Dirty Love" was first released onto YouTube on 27 August 2014. The video has since accumulated nearly 7,943,000 views as of 4 October 2018.

Track listing

Chart performance

Weekly charts

References

2014 singles
2014 songs
RAM Records singles
Wilkinson (musician) songs